Lestes sigma, the chalky spreadwing, is a species of spreadwing in the damselfly family Lestidae. It is found in Central America and North America.

The IUCN conservation status of Lestes sigma is "LC", least concern, with no immediate threat to the species' survival. The population is stable. The IUCN status was reviewed in 2017.

References

Further reading

 

Lestes
Articles created by Qbugbot
Insects described in 1901